Christophe Lutundula Apala is a member of the National Assembly of the Democratic Republic of the Congo and the Deputy President of the Assembly.

Career 
On March 25, 2009, he became President ad interim of the Assembly following the resignation of Vital Kamerhe. He was succeeded by Évariste Boshab on April 18, 2009. He was appointed Vice-Premier minister/Minister of Foreign Affairs on April 12, 2021 in the new government of Sama Lukonde.

Lutundula Commission

Lutundula helped create the Lutundula Commission, an important investigation by the post-war transition government into mining contracts signed by both rebels and government employees with mining companies during both the First and Second Congo Wars.

The commission recommended suspending new contracting during the transition, but this suggestion was ignored. The government signed several new contracts with multinationals, mostly forming joint ventures with one of the government enterprises in the sector such as Gécamines, Societé Minière de Bakwanga (MIBO) and Kilo-Moto Mining Company (OKIMO).

See also
 Conflict resource
 Corruption in the Democratic Republic of the Congo

References

Members of the National Assembly (Democratic Republic of the Congo)
Living people
Anti-corruption activists
Year of birth missing (living people)
Foreign Ministers of the Democratic Republic of the Congo
21st-century Democratic Republic of the Congo people